Myself < Letting Go is the debut album by metalcore band To Speak of Wolves.  It was released on May 18, 2010, through Solid State Records. The first single released from the album was "Darkness Often Yields the Brightest Light".

Track listing

Personnel
To Speak Of Wolves
Rick Jacobs - Vocals
Corey Doran - Rhythm Guitar 
Aaron Kisling -  Lead Guitar 
Will McCutcheon - Bass
Phil Chamberlain - Drums
additional music written by Aaron Shelton and Chris Shelton
Production
Produced & engineered by Brooks Paschal & Tyson Shipman
Mixed by Jason Suecof & Ronn Miller
Mastered by Troy Glessner
A&R by Brian Kroll
Art direction by TSOW

References 

2010 debut albums
To Speak of Wolves albums
Solid State Records albums